Claude Parfait Ngon A Djam (born 24 January 1980) is a Cameroonian former professional footballer who played as a striker.

Honours

Club honors
Sriwijaya
Copa Indonesia: 2008–09

External links

1980 births
Living people
Association football forwards
Cameroonian footballers
Cameroon international footballers
2003 FIFA Confederations Cup players
Cameroonian expatriate footballers
Expatriate footballers in Indonesia
Expatriate footballers in Latvia
Expatriate men's footballers in Denmark
Coton Sport FC de Garoua players
Canon Yaoundé players
FK Rīga players
Skonto FC players
AC Horsens players
Liga 1 (Indonesia) players
Sriwijaya F.C. players
K League 1 players
Seongnam FC players